Thomas Rhett Akins Sr. (born October 13, 1969) is an American singer and songwriter. Signed to Decca Records between 1994 and 1997, he released two albums for that label (1995's A Thousand Memories and 1996's Somebody New), followed by 1998's What Livin's All About on MCA Nashville. Friday Night in Dixie was released in 2002 on Audium Entertainment. Overall, his albums have accounted for fourteen singles on the Billboard Hot Country Songs, including the number one "Don't Get Me Started" from 1996.

Although he has not charted a single since 2006, Akins has written singles for other country music singers, primarily as one-third of the songwriting team The Peach Pickers, alongside Dallas Davidson and Ben Hayslip. Akins's son, Thomas Rhett, is also a singer.

Early life
Rhett Akins was born on October 13, 1969, in Valdosta, Georgia, to Pamela LaHood and Thomas Akins. By age 11, he and his two younger brothers had formed a band.  Rhett played football at the University of Georgia and studied business but gave up his studies after a year. He then worked for his father’s oil and gas distribution company.

Career

1992–1994: Move to Nashville and recording contract
In 1992, after performing in the theme park show "Music Country Music" at Fiesta Texas in San Antonio, Texas, Akins moved to Nashville, Tennessee, and performed in "Country Music USA" at Opryland Theme Park. Akins then became a demo singer before Decca Records signed him to a recording contract.

1994–1997: A Thousand Memories and Somebody New
Akins's first single was "What They're Talkin' About", a No. 35 on the Billboard country charts in late 1994, followed by the No. 36 "I Brake for Brunettes". After these first two singles came his signature song, "That Ain't My Truck". This was his breakthrough hit, peaking at No. 3 on the country charts in mid-1995. All three of these songs were included on his 1995 debut album A Thousand Memories, which also produced the No. 17 "She Said Yes". Also in 1995 and 1996, Akins toured with Reba McEntire. In 1995, he was named one of Country America's "Top New Stars".

Akins' second album, Somebody New, produced his only number one hit in "Don't Get Me Started", which peaked in August 1996. The other three singles from Somebody New were less successful, with "Love You Back" (the second single) becoming his last top 40 hit at No. 38.

1997–2004: Transfer to MCA Nashville, What Livin's All About, and Friday Night in Dixie
After Decca's Nashville division was merged into MCA Nashville in 1997, Akins was transferred to MCA Nashville for the release of his third album, 1998's What Livin's All About. This album was even less successful, however, with its lead-off single "More Than Everything" falling one space short of top 40 in the U.S., although it was a No. 25 hit on the RPM country charts in Canada. Also in 1998, Akins charted with a cover of Eddie Rabbitt's 1980 number one hit "Drivin' My Life Away", which Akins covered on the soundtrack to the 1998 film Black Dog.

In 2000, he voiced the character of Tom Sawyer in MGM's animated remake of Tom Sawyer alongside fellow country singer Mark Wills, who voiced Huckleberry Finn, as well as Lee Ann Womack, who voiced Becky's singing voice. A fourth album, Friday Night in Dixie, was released in 2002 on Koch Records. This album's only two singles, "Highway Sunrise" and "In Your Love", peaked at No. 55 and No. 57, respectively.

2005–2006: BNA Records and People Like Me
Akins did not release another single until his signing with BNA Records in 2005, when he released the No. 57-peaking "Kiss My Country Ass", which was later recorded by Blake Shelton for his 2010 extended play Hillbilly Bone. It was included on his album People Like Me, which was originally to have been released via BNA on June 14, 2006, but was ultimately self-released in June 2007. "If Heaven Wasn't So Far Away" was the second single from People Like Me, which failed to chart for Akins, but was later recorded by Justin Moore, whose version went to number 1. Down South followed in 2008, as did its only single, the title track, which again failed to chart.

2009–2010: Michael Waddell's Bone Collector: The Brotherhood Album
In 2009, Akins released the single "Hung Up", which did not chart. It was later included on the 2010 album Michael Waddell's Bone Collector: The Brotherhood Album, a collaboration with fellow country music singer Dallas Davidson, released through Reprise Records Nashville.

Songwriting career
In the late 2000s, Akins began writing songs for other artists, primarily with Ben Hayslip and Dallas Davidson, collaboratively known as The Peach Pickers. Among the singles that Akins has co-written are "Put a Girl in It" recorded by Brooks & Dunn, "Barefoot and Crazy" by Jack Ingram, "Gimmie That Girl" and "The Shape I'm In" by Joe Nichols, "All About Tonight", "Honey Bee", "I Lived It", and "Boys 'Round Here" by Blake Shelton, "When She Says Baby", "Just Gettin' Started", "Tonight Looks Good on You" by Jason Aldean, "All Over Me" by Josh Turner, "Hot Mess" by Tyler Farr, "Farmer's Daughter" and "Take a Back Road" by Rodney Atkins, "Bait a Hook" and "Point at You" by Justin Moore, "I Can Take It from There" by Chris Young, "I Know Somebody" by LoCash, "Parking Lot Party", "That Don't Sound Like You" by Lee Brice, "Hey Girl" by Billy Currington, "I Don't Want This Night to End", "Huntin', Fishin' and Lovin' Every Day" by Luke Bryan, "Wild in Your Smile", "Mind Reader", "Small Town Boy" by Dustin Lynch, "It Goes Like This", "Get Me Some of That" and "Star of the Show" by Thomas Rhett, "Granddaddy's Gun" by Aaron Lewis and "A Buncha Girls", "Young & Crazy" by Frankie Ballard, "Kick It in the Sticks", "Small Town Throwdown" by Brantley Gilbert., "Ready Set Roll" by Chase Rice, "Dirt on My Boots" by Jon Pardi and "Missing" by William Michael Morgan.

Personal life
Akins married Paige Braswell in 1989, but they have since divorced. They have a son, Thomas Rhett Akins Jr. (born March 30, 1990) and a daughter, Kasey Lee Akins (born 1993). The younger Rhett is also a country music singer.

Akins married Sonya Mansfield in 2017. They had their first child on March 13, 2020, a boy.

Discography

Studio albums

Collaboration albums

Singles

Other charted songs

Music videos

Filmography

Awards & Nominations

Nominations
Academy of Country Music
 1997 Top New Male Vocalist

American Music Awards
 1995 Favorite Country New Artist

References

External links
 Official website

1969 births
Living people
People from Valdosta, Georgia
American country singer-songwriters
American male singer-songwriters
Country musicians from Georgia (U.S. state)
MCA Records artists
Decca Records artists
MNRK Music Group artists
BNA Records artists
Reprise Records artists
Musicians from Nashville, Tennessee
Country musicians from Tennessee
Singer-songwriters from Georgia (U.S. state)
Singer-songwriters from Tennessee